Emma Elizabeth Reynolds (born 2 November 1977) is a British Labour politician who served as the Member of Parliament (MP) for Wolverhampton North East from 2010 to 2019, and the Shadow Secretary of State for Communities and Local Government in 2015.

Early life and career
Reynolds was educated at Codsall High School in Staffordshire, near Wolverhampton, followed by Wulfrun Further Education College. She studied at Wadham College at the University of Oxford, where she read Politics, Philosophy and Economics. Her step father Kevin taught at Concord College, a boarding independent school set in the grounds of Acton Burnell Castle, near Shrewsbury.

Reynolds set up a lobbying business in Brussels to help British companies that wished to influence EU laws.

From 2001 to 2004, Reynolds worked in Brussels as a political adviser to Robin Cook then President of the Party of European Socialists. She later worked  in Downing Street and the House of Commons as a special advisor to then Minister for Europe and Government Chief Whip Geoff Hoon.

In January 2009, Reynolds joined commercial public affairs consultancy Cogitamus, which gives advice to companies.

Parliamentary career
Reynolds was selected as the Labour candidate for the 2010 general election for Wolverhampton North East in September 2008. Despite a 9% swing to the Conservatives and a reduction in majority of more than 6,000, she held the seat for Labour.

Reynolds has spoken on many issues in the House of Commons including questions on Building Schools for the Future, free school meals, human trafficking, cuts to police numbers and Mental Health Services. In the summer of 2010 Reynolds was also elected to the Foreign Affairs Select Committee of the House of Commons.

In October 2010, Reynolds was promoted by Labour's new leader, Ed Miliband, to the opposition frontbench, as a shadow junior Foreign Office Minister under the then Shadow Foreign Secretary, Yvette Cooper. After the resignation of the Shadow Chancellor Alan Johnson and resulting mini-reshuffle of posts, Reynolds continued working in her post under the new Shadow Foreign Secretary, Douglas Alexander. In October 2011, Emma Reynolds was promoted by Labour leader, Ed Miliband, to the position of Shadow Europe Minister. In October 2013, Reynolds was promoted by Ed Miliband to the position of Shadow Housing Minister, replacing Jack Dromey. In May 2015, after the 2015 general election, Reynolds was promoted to the position of Shadow Communities and Local Government Secretary by acting leader of the Labour Party Harriet Harman, following the resignation of Ed Miliband.

Reynolds is former Treasurer of the All-Party Parliamentary China Group and Vice Chair for the All-Party Parliamentary Group for British Sikhs, as well as Secretary of the All-Party Parliamentary Group on Human Trafficking.

Reynolds resigned as Shadow Secretary of State for Communities and Local Government following the election of Jeremy Corbyn as leader of the Labour Party. She later supported Owen Smith in the 2016 Labour Party leadership election.

She was defeated in the 2019 election by the Conservatives' Jane Stevenson.

Views on the European Union
In an online article for the New Labour pressure group Progress in 2011, Reynolds asserted that "Britain's membership of the European Union is in our national interest".

In an October 2012 interview with the Total Politics website, Reynolds called for the eurozone countries to integrate more closely. She also said she had differing opinions with Jon Cruddas, Labour's policy review chief, on whether having a referendum on the EU was a priority. In the run-up to the 2016 EU referendum, Reynolds campaigned for Britain Stronger in Europe.

Post-parliamentary career
Following her departure from parliament in 2019, Reynolds was appointed as Managing Director of Public Affairs, Policy & Research at TheCityUK, a special interest group lobbying the UK Government on behalf of the financial sector.

On 19 November 2022, Reynolds was selected to be the Labour Party's parliamentary candidate for Wycombe, at the next general election.

Personal life
Reynolds participates in sports such as running and used to play football. She also enjoys pubs and going to the cinema.

Reynolds married solicitor Richard Stevens in April 2016. They had a son on 14 April 2017. They had a second son in May 2019.

References

External links 
 

|-

|-

|-

1977 births
Living people
Alumni of Wadham College, Oxford
British consultants
British lobbyists
British special advisers
Female members of the Parliament of the United Kingdom for English constituencies
Labour Party (UK) MPs for English constituencies
People from Wolverhampton
UK MPs 2010–2015
UK MPs 2015–2017
UK MPs 2017–2019
21st-century British women politicians
21st-century English women
21st-century English people